Constance Kramer Wilson (born August 9, 1959) was a Republican member of the North Carolina General Assembly representing the state's one hundred fourth district, including constituents in Mecklenburg county. A banker from Charlotte, North Carolina, Wilson was elected to the state house six times, resigning on October 15, 2004, shortly before completing her sixth term. Wilson previously served one term in the State Senate. She was born in Dayton, Ohio. She has a B.S. in Finance from Indiana University.

Since her retirement from the state legislature Wilson has worked as a lobbyist.

References

|-

|-

Living people
Members of the North Carolina House of Representatives
Women state legislators in North Carolina
1959 births
21st-century American politicians
21st-century American women politicians
Politicians from Dayton, Ohio